Papiorg Landscape Conservation Area is a nature park in Viljandi County, Estonia.

The area of the nature park is 4 ha.

The protected area was founded in 1964 to protect steep-sloped river valley.

References

Nature reserves in Estonia
Geography of Viljandi County